The 2022–23 Honduran gang crackdown, referred to in Honduras as the Régimen de Excepción (Spanish for State of Exception), began in December 2022 after parts of the constitution were suspended to fight criminal gangs in the country.

Announcement 

On 24 November 2022, the government of Honduras declared a state of emergency regarding gang violence in the country. On 3 December 2022, the government announced that some constitutional rights would be suspended in the cities of Tegucigalpa and San Pedro Sula to crackdown on criminal gangs in those two cities, particularly Mara Salvatrucha (MS-13) and 18th Street Gang. In those cities, the gangs are accused of extorting residents in exchange for protection from violence, and of killing people who refuse to pay. According to Association for a More Just Society, the gangs earn an estimated US$737 million through extortion. Gustavo Sánchez, the commissioner of the National Police, stated the state of exception would persist for 30 days.

Xiomara Castro, the president of Honduras, condemned the gangs' use of extortion, stating, "[Extortion] is one of the main causes of insecurity, migration, displacement, loss of freedom, violent deaths and the closure of small and medium-sized businesses. With the comprehensive strategy against extortion and related crimes announced today by the national police, this government of democratic socialism declares war on extortion." According to Leandro Osorio, the former commissioner of the National Police, the crackdown would "carry repressive actions" and would "penetrate" the gangs to capture their leaders. Raúl Pineda Alvarado, a Honduran security analyst, stated that the crackdown would be an "imitation" of a similar gang crackdown in El Salvador which began in March 2022.

Crackdown 

The crackdown began on 6 December 2022 at 6:00 p.m. when 2,000 police officers entered areas controlled by the gangs in Tegucigalpa and San Pedro Sula.

On 8 January 2023, Castro extended the state of exception by 45 days.

References 

Conflicts in 2022
Conflicts in 2023
December 2022 events in North America
Human rights in Honduras
Organized crime conflicts
2022 in Honduras
2023 in Honduras
MS-13
Gangs in Honduras